Catalist is a for-profit corporation based in Washington, D.C., that operates a voter database and works for progressive causes.

History
Catalist was founded as Data Warehouse, LLC. Catalist's first CEO was Laura Quinn, a former economic policy advisor in the U.S. Senate and Deputy Chief of Staff for Vice President Al Gore.

In August 2016, Catalist analyzed records from 10 battleground states through June and found a major influx of new voters, majority-white, were responsible for the record-breaking turnout in the Republican primaries. After the 2020 election, Catalist published an analysis of turnout and votes among various demographic groups that contributed to the Biden / Harris ticket's victory.

During the 2008 U.S. presidential campaign, Catalist served as the principal repository of Democratic data, working with over 90 liberal groups including the Service Employees International Union, the Democratic National Committee, and the 2008 Barack Obama presidential campaign.

Catalist has engaged in data mining on behalf of clients such as Rock the Vote and EMILY's List. Catalist receives funding from the Democracy Alliance.

In 2015, Catalist received $725,000 from the National Education Association, a major teachers union.

The company as of 2018 claims that it has data on 240 million unique individuals in the United States, to be used by "progressive" organizations. Laura Quinn remained chief executive officer.

In June 2021, 30 workers for Catalist announced that a super majority of workers had signed union authorization cards to be represented by the Communication Workers of America through CODE-CWA, and that Catalist had voluntarily recognized the workers' union. They did not unionize to improve working conditions, but because workers felt that since the company does work for the labor movement, its employees should be unionized.

See also

 Blue State Digital
 Civis Analytics
 Data dredging
 Dan Wagner (data scientist)
 The Groundwork
 Harper Reed
 Left-wing politics
 Michael Slaby
 ORCA (computer system)
 Project Houdini
 Project Narwhal
 Predictive analytics

References

2006 establishments in Washington, D.C.
Companies based in Washington, D.C.
Political campaign techniques
Political campaign technology
Progressive organizations in the United States
Technology companies established in 2006
2008 United States presidential election